Gao Feng (born February 2, 1982, in Liaoning) is a female Chinese judoka who competed in the 2004 Summer Olympics.

She won the bronze medal in the extra-lightweight class.

References
 profile

External links
 

1982 births
Living people
Judoka at the 2004 Summer Olympics
Olympic bronze medalists for China
Olympic judoka of China
People from Fushun
Olympic medalists in judo
Asian Games medalists in judo
Sportspeople from Liaoning
Medalists at the 2004 Summer Olympics
Judoka at the 2006 Asian Games
Chinese female judoka
Asian Games gold medalists for China
Medalists at the 2006 Asian Games
21st-century Chinese women